Johann Joachim Quantz (1697–1773) was a German flutist and composer.

Quantz may also refer to:

 QuantZ, a 2009 puzzle video game
 Quantz Verzeichnis, a catalogue of compositions by Johann Joachim Quantz, created by Horst Augsbach
 Qwantz.com, the host of Dinosaur Comics
 9911 Quantz, a minor planet

See also
 Quantztown, Ontario